Ara Rock is a rock found in Ara Town in Nasarawa Local Government Area  of Nasarawa State in central Nigeria.

Location 

Cultural significance 
Annual festivals and cultural displays are held on the rock by the settlers of the town who worship annually on the rock.

References 

Natural monoliths
Rock formations of Nigeria
Geology of Nigeria